Louis Etienne Jean Léonce Balluet d'Estournelles de Constant de Rebecque (15 September 1859 – 31 July 1949) was a sailor from France, who represented his country at the 1900 Summer Olympics in Meulan, France. Jean d'Estournelles de Constant as helmsman, took the 5th place in first race of the 0.5 to 1 ton and did not finished in the second race. He did this with the boat Pierre et Jean.

Further reading

References

External links

French male sailors (sport)
Sailors at the 1900 Summer Olympics – .5 to 1 ton
Olympic sailors of France
Jean
1859 births
1949 deaths
Sailors at the 1900 Summer Olympics – 0 to .5 ton
Sailors at the 1900 Summer Olympics – Open class